The Many Moods of Belafonte is an album by Harry Belafonte, released by RCA Victor (LSP-2574) in 1962. The album features performances by South African trumpeter Hugh Masekela and vocalist Miriam Makeba.

Track listing
"Tongue Tie Baby" (William Eaton) – 3:21
"Who's Gonna Be Your Man" (Fred Brooks) – 3:42
"'Long About Now" (Fred Hellerman, Fran Minkoff) – 3:55
"Bamotsweri" – 2:33
"I'm On My Way to Saturday" (Margo Guryan) – 2:45
"Betty an' Dupree" – 5:19
"Summertime Love" (Frank Loesser) – 3:58
"Lyla, Lyla" (M. Zeira, N. Alterman) – 3:26
"Zombie Jamboree" (Traditional) – 3:35
 "Try To Remember" (Tom Jones, Harvey Schmidt) – 3:24
"Dark as a Dungeon" (Merle Travis) – 4:15

Personnel
Harry Belafonte – vocals
Miriam Makeba – vocals on "Bamotsweri"
Ernie Calabria – guitar
Millard Thomas – guitar
Jay Berliner – guitar
Hugh Masekela – trumpet
John Cartwright – bass
Norman Keenan – bass
Bill Salter – bass
Percy Brice – drums
Ralph MacDonald – percussion
Auchee Lee – percussion
Danny Barrajanos – percussion
Julio Collazo – percussion
Production notes:
Bob Bollard – producer
Orchestra conducted by William Eaton
William Eaton – leader
Bob Simpson – engineer
Ed Begley – mastering
Peter Perri – cover photo

Chart positions

References

1962 albums
Harry Belafonte albums
RCA Victor albums